The 1920 Chicago Maroons football team was an American football team that represented the University of Chicago during the 1920 college football season. In their 29th season under head coach Amos Alonzo Stagg, the Maroons compiled a 3–4 record, finished in eighth place in the Big Ten Conference, and outscored their opponents by a combined total of 77 to 27.

Schedule

References

Chicago
Chicago Maroons football seasons
Chicago Maroons football